Alessandro Ligi (born 7 November 1989) is an Italian footballer who plays as a centre back for  club Audace Cerignola.

Club career

Early career

Crotone

Parma
In July 2013, Ligi (€150,000), Denílson Gabionetta (€200,000), Francesco Checcucci (€200,000) and Giuseppe Caccavallo (€50,000) were sold to Parma, all in co-ownership deal except Checcucci; Crotone signed Tomislav Šarić (€200,000), Giuseppe Prestia (€50,000) and Caio Secco (€250) in exchange, also in co-ownership deals.

In April 2014, after a crash during the match, he suffered from collapsed lung.

In June 2014 Crotone acquired Lebran and Mantovani outright, while Parma acquired Caccavallo, Mauro Cioffi and Massimo Loviso outright, as well as bought back Prestia; the co-ownership of Denílson, Ligi, Šarić and Secco were renewed.

Bari
On 29 July 2014 he was signed by Bari on a 3-year contract from Parma and Crotone for an undisclosed fee (Crotone received €300,000). Earlier that month fellow Parma defender Luca Ceppitelli was recalled from Bari after the expire of the loan.

On 22 January 2015 Ligi went to Virtus Entella, with Leandro Rinaudo moving in the opposite direction.

On 6 July 2015 Ligi was signed by U.S. Avellino 1912 in a temporary deal.

On 1 February 2016 Ligi signed for Vicenza on a loan deal until 30 June 2016, with an option to make the deal permanent.

Cesena
On 22 July 2016 Ligi was signed by Cesena on a two-year deal.

Carpi
On 31 August 2017 Ligi was signed by fellow Serie B club Carpi on a three-year contract.

Spezia
On 31 January 2019, he joined Spezia on loan with a purchase option.

Serie C
On 2 September 2020 he signed a two-year contract with Triestina.

On 7 August 2022, he moved to Audace Cerignola.

References

External links
 
 AIC profile (data by football.it) 
 

1989 births
Living people
Sportspeople from the Province of Pesaro and Urbino
Footballers from Marche
Italian footballers
Association football defenders
Serie B players
Serie C players
Lega Pro Seconda Divisione players
A.S.D. Victor San Marino players
A.C. Bellaria Igea Marina players
U.S. Triestina Calcio 1918 players
F.C. Crotone players
Parma Calcio 1913 players
S.S.C. Bari players
Virtus Entella players
U.S. Avellino 1912 players
L.R. Vicenza players
A.C. Cesena players
A.C. Carpi players
Spezia Calcio players
S.S.D. Audace Cerignola players
Italian expatriate footballers
Expatriate footballers in San Marino
Italian expatriate sportspeople in San Marino